Hamidiyeh County is in Khuzestan province, Iran. The capital of the county is the city of Hamidiyeh. At the 2006 census, the region's population (as Hamidiyeh District of Ahvaz County) was 48,372 in 8,391 households. The following census in 2011 counted 46,902 people in 10,511 households. It was separated from Ahvaz County on 12 December 2011. At the 2016 census, the population of newly formed Hamidiyeh County was 53,762 in 13,598 households.

Administrative divisions

The population history and structural changes of Hamidiyeh County's administrative divisions over three consecutive censuses are shown in the following table. The latest census shows two districts, four rural districts, and one city.

References

Counties of Khuzestan Province

fa:شهرستان حمیدیه